Oak Grove is a ghost town in Mohave County, Arizona, United States.

References

Former populated places in Mohave County, Arizona